Adolf Urban (9 January 1914 – 23 May 1943) was a German footballer. Urban played as a forward for the football club Schalke 04, among others. He has made 21 appearances for Germany between 1935 and 1941, scoring 11 goals. He was also part of Germany's squad at the 1936 Summer Olympics.

Urban was the son of Polish immigrants (see Ruhrpolen), who came to the Ruhr area from Olsztyn, which was located within the Prussian Partition of Poland since the First Partition of Poland.

In the Second World War Urban was mobilised with the Wehrmacht in which he served in the 422nd Infantry Regiment on the Eastern Front in Russia, fighting at the battle of Demyansk. He later died in 1943 in Staraya Russa, from wounds received in further fighting. He was the only member of the Breslau Eleven to die in combat.

His body was buried in the Karpovo Military Cemetery but was later repatriated and reburied in November 2013 in Schalke cemetery in Gelsenkirchen.

References

External links

1914 births
1943 deaths
German footballers
Germany international footballers
German people of Polish descent
Olympic footballers of Germany
Footballers at the 1936 Summer Olympics
Association football forwards
FC Schalke 04 players
German Army personnel killed in World War II
German Army personnel of World War II
Sportspeople from Gelsenkirchen
Footballers from North Rhine-Westphalia